Richard John Williams (born February 1, 1950) is an American guitarist, primarily known for being one of the only consistent original members of the rock band Kansas alongside drummer Phil Ehart. Both have appeared on every Kansas album to date.

Career 
Williams shared guitar duties with keyboardist/guitarist Kerry Livgren until 1984 when Kansas first broke up, and later from 1990 to 1991 and 1999 to 2000. From 1985 to 1991, he shared guitar-playing with Steve Morse, and later with Zak Rizvi from 2016 to 2021. Since April 2021, Williams has served as the band's only dedicated guitarist, as he also did from 1991 to 1999, and 2000 to 2016. David Ragsdale will sometimes serve as a second guitarist when the band plays songs with little or no violin, such as "Portrait (He Knew)", "Fight Fire With Fire", and "Carry On Wayward Son". Williams and Phil Ehart are the only two founding members of Kansas who have never left the band and have played on all Kansas albums. Among the songs he co-wrote with the band are "Can I Tell You", "No Room for a Stranger", and the hit "Play the Game Tonight".

In 2009, Williams, along with fellow Kansas members Ehart, Billy Greer, and David Ragsdale, formed a group called Native Window that released one album.

Discography

Kansas

Native Window 

 Native Window (2009)

As a guest 

 Steve Walsh – Schemer-DreamerSchemer-Dreamer (1980) (on "Schemer-Dreamer/That's All Right")
 Seventh Key – Seventh Key (2001) (on "Missy", "Every Time It Rains" and "No Man's Land")
 John Elefante – On My Way to The Sun (2013) (on "This Is How The Story Goes")

Personal life 
Williams lost his right eye in a childhood fireworks accident. He wore a prosthetic eye for many years but now wears an eye patch instead. As a child, Williams began playing a ukulele but quickly transitioned to guitar. His early influences included the Beatles and the overall British Invasion. In 2020, Williams and his wife, Debbie, relocated to Linville, North Carolina. Williams is also a fan of the Kansas City Chiefs.

External links 
 Richard Williams fan site

References 

1951 births
Living people
Musicians from Topeka, Kansas
American rock guitarists
American male guitarists
American people with disabilities
Kansas (band) members
Progressive rock guitarists
Guitarists from Kansas
20th-century American guitarists